The Ministry of Public Works and Transport (MPWT or PWT) is a government ministry of Laos. Its head office is in Vientiane.

Agencies
 Department of Civil Aviation

References

External links
 Ministry of Public Works and Transport
 Ministry of Public Works and Transport 
 
Laos, Public Works and Transport
Ministries of the Government of Laos
Transport organizations based in Laos